Encarnação is a novel written by the Brazilian writer José de Alencar. It was first published, posthumously, in 1893.

External links
  Encarnação, the book

1893 Brazilian novels
Novels by José de Alencar
Portuguese-language novels